Petrijevci is a municipality in Slavonia, in the Osijek-Baranja County of northeastern Croatia. There are 2439 inhabitants, of which 97.39% are Croats, according to the 2011 census.

Name 
The name of the village in Croatian is plural.

History
In the late 19th and early 20th century, Petrijevci was part of the Virovitica County of the Kingdom of Croatia-Slavonia.

References

External links 
  

Municipalities of Croatia
Slavonia